Jhumpura is a census town and a block  in Kendujhar district in the Indian state of Odisha.

Demographics
 India census, Jhumpura had a population of 16,064. Males constitute 52% of the population and females 48%. Jhumpura has an average literacy rate of 82.73%, higher than the national average of 72.87%: male literacy is 88.31%, and female literacy is 76.72%. In Jhumpura, 13% of the population is under 6 years of age.

Educational institutions
Green Field School
 P.S. College, Jhumpura
 P.S High School
 Kerala English Medium School
 Misbha English Medium School
 Saraswati Sishu Mandir
 Jhumpura Maktab

Transport

By road
 Jhumpura is well connected by Road. NH-20 (Formerly 215) passes through the town.
 Regular bus service with major cities like Kendujhar (20 km), Barbil (38 km), Bhubaneswar, Cuttack, Rourkela, Kolkata.

By rail
 Nearest Railway station is Porjanpur railway station, 11 km from town.
 Barbil-Puri express (Daily) and Puri-Chakradharapur (Daily), Tata-Visakhapatnam express (weekly) pass through the station.

By air 
Nearest airport is Bhubaneswar (245 km).

References

Cities and towns in Kendujhar district